This is a timeline documenting events of Jazz in the year 1901.

Events

 Charles Booth performs Creole Belles by J. Bodewalt Lampe. His performance was the first acoustic recording of ragtime to be made commercially available, for the new Victor label.

Standards

Births

 February
 11 – Claude Jones, American trombonist (died 1962).

 March
 27 – Enrique Santos Discépolo, Argentine tango and milonga pianist, bandoneón player, ainger, and composer (died 1951).
 29 – Sidney Arodin, American clarinetist and songwriter (died 1948).

 May
 11 – Edmond Hall, American clarinetist and bandleader (died 1967).
 20 – Jimmy Blythe, American pianist and composer (died 1931).
 30 – Frankie Trumbauer, American saxophonist, composer, and bandleader (died 1956).

 June
 8 – Lou Black, American banjo player (died 1965).

 July
 1 – Richard Plunket Greene, English musician and author, Bright Young Things (died 1978).

 August
 4 – Louis Armstrong, American trumpeter, composer, singer, and actor (died 1971).
 25 – Charlie Burse, African-American ukulele player (died 1965).
 26 – Jimmy Rushing, American blues shouter, balladeer, singer, and pianist (died 1972).

 September
 2 – Phil Napoleon, American trumpeter and bandleader (died 1990).
 30 – Thelma Terry, American bandleader and upright bassist (died 1966).

 October
 17 – Lee Collins, American trumpeter (died 1960).
 18 – Annette Hanshaw, American singer (died 1985).
 20 – Adelaide Hall, American singer and entertainer (died 1993).

 November
 9 – Muggsy Spanier, American cornetist (died 1967).
 16 – Jesse Stone, American pianist and songwriter (died 1999).
 22 – Polo Barnes, American clarinetist and saxophonist (died 1981).

 December
 22 – Danny Polo, American clarinetist (died 1949).

References

External links
 History Of Jazz Timeline: 1901 at All About Jazz

Jazz, 1901 In
Jazz by year